The Sivakanta Athikarappatthiram is one of the sub-sections of Arul Nool which was the secondary scripture of Ayyavazhi. 
The author of the content is unknown. This contains the rules and regulations for the world. It is meant in the way that Ayya giving the acts to Hari Gopalan Citar by sitting in the Pathi facing the north direction while Citar face the south.

Ayyavazhi texts